George Henry Schildmiller (January 9, 1882 – after 1947) was an American football player and coach.  He played for Dartmouth College and coached at the University of Maine in 1909 and at Oregon State University in 1910.

Early life and playing career
Schildmiller was born on January 9, 1882, in Brattleboro, Vermont.  He played football and basketball at Dartmouth College.  In 1908, he was named to the College Football All-America Team.  He was also a letter winner for the basketball team in the 1906–07 and 1907–08 seasons.

Coaching career
At the conclusion of his playing career, Schildmiller coached at the University of Maine.  He remained at Maine for one season and posted a record of 3–4–1.

In 1910, Schildmiller came to Corvallis, Oregon to become the head football coach at Oregon State, known then as Oregon Agricultural College. He coached for only one season at OSU as well and posted a record of 3–2–1.

Personal

Schildmiller lived in the Cincinnati metro area during the 1930s and 1940s, where his daughter, Dorothy "Dolly" Schildmiller, was a top-level competitive golfer, winning the city golf championship five times. His son, George A. Schildmiller, enlisted in the Army shortly after the start of World War II and died in Alsace, France on December 19, 1944. The young lieutenant was posthumously awarded a silver star for bravery when he was killed exposing himself to target an enemy tank.

Head coaching record

References

1882 births
Year of death missing
American football ends
American men's basketball players
Dartmouth Big Green football players
Dartmouth Big Green men's basketball players
Maine Black Bears football coaches
Oregon State Beavers football coaches
All-American college football players
People from Brattleboro, Vermont
Coaches of American football from Vermont
Players of American football from Vermont